Valle de Valdelaguna is a town in the province of Burgos, Autonomous Community of Castilla y León (Spain), region of the Complaint, the judicial district of Salas de los Infantes. Its capital is the town of Huerta de Abajo.

See also
Tolbaños de Abajo
Tolbaños de Arriba

References

Towns in Spain